this will be the 25th edition of Kuwait Crown Prince Cup where the 15 teams are split into 2 groups where top 2 from each group advance to the final.

Kuwait SC are the defending champions.

Group-Stage

Group A

Group B

Knockout stage

Matches

Semi-finals

Final

Awards
Golden Boot: Bobby Clement 
Golden Glove: Sulaiman Abdulghafour

References

External links

Kuwait Crown Prince Cup
Kuwait Crown Prince Cup
Crown Prince Cup